The 2013 South Seas Island Resort Women's Pro Classic was a professional tennis tournament played on outdoor hard courts. It was the first edition of the tournament which was part of the 2013 ITF Women's Circuit, offering a total of $50,000 in prize money. It took place in Captiva Island, United States, on November 4–10, 2013.

Singles entrants

Seeds 

 1 Rankings as of October 28, 2013

Other entrants 
The following players received wildcards into the singles main draw:
  Julia Boserup
  Ellie Halbauer
  Nikki Kallenberg

The following players received entry from the qualifying draw:
  Maria Fernanda Alves
  Jacqueline Cako
  Lauren Embree
  Chiara Scholl

The following player received entry by a protected ranking:
  Ulrikke Eikeri

Champions

Singles 

  Mandy Minella def.  Gabriela Dabrowski 6–3, 6–3

Doubles 

  Gabriela Dabrowski /  Allie Will def.  Julia Boserup /  Alexandra Mueller 6–1, 6–2

External links 
 2013 South Seas Island Resort Women's Pro Classic at ITFtennis.com
 

2013 ITF Women's Circuit
2013 in American tennis
2013 in sports in Florida
Tennis tournaments in Florida